Mashi is a Local Government Area in Katsina State, Nigeria, sharing a border with the Republic of Niger. Its headquarters are in the town of Mashi in the southwest of the area at.

It has an area of 905 km and a population of 173,134 at the 2006 census.

The postal code of the area is 823.

References

Local Government Areas in Katsina State